Zhuravlikha is a rural locality (a settlement) in Barguzinsky District, Republic of Buryatia, Russia. The population was 83 as of 2010. There is 1 street.

Geography 
Zhuravlikha is located 22 km southwest of Barguzin (the district's administrative centre) by road. Zorino is the nearest rural locality.

References 

Rural localities in Barguzinsky District